Tommi Liimatta (born 14 January 1976 in Kemi, Finland) is a musician, writer and a poet most famous for being the singer, songwriter and lyricist for the rock group Absoluuttinen Nollapiste. His other works include a novel, a prose poem collection, three comic books and two solo albums (Liimatan Pan Alley, 1996 and Tropical Cocktail, 2006). He has also illustrated most of the album covers for Absoluuttinen Nollapiste.

Bibliography
 Avainlastu (WSOY 2002) - collection of aphorisms, prose and prose poetry
 Aksel Sunnarborgin hymy (WSOY 2004) - novel
 Muovikorvo (WSOY 2007) - novel
 Sivuhistoria - Levyttämättömiä sanoituksia 1987-2007 (WSOY 2008) - collection of lyrics
 Nilikki (WSOY 2009)

Comic books
 Vähän hyviä juttuja '90-'91 (Björklund & Bergman 1999)
 Rengin tarpeet (Renkikustannus 2000)
 Masturbaatio Ranualla (WSOY 2003)
 Ei vaikuta keikkaan (WSOY 2005)

Solo discography

 Liimatan Pan Alley (Johanna kustannus / J. Karppanen 1996)
 Tropical Cocktail (Johanna kustannus / J. Karppanen 2006)

External links
 Tommi Liimatta at Absoluuttinen Nollapiste official website 

1976 births
Living people
People from Kemi
Finnish comics artists
Finnish male writers
21st-century Finnish male singers